The 1980 AFC Youth Championship was held from 21 February to 1 March 1981 in Bangkok, Thailand. The tournament was won by for the fifth time by South Korea.

Qualification 

The finals will consist of five teams from the qualification phase.  Qualification consisted of two groups with the top two of Group 1 and the top three of Group 2 qualifying for the final tournament.

Qualified teams 
 (Qualification Group 1 winners)
 (Qualification Group 1 runners-up)
 (Qualification Group 2 winners)
 (Qualification Group 2 runners-up)
 (Qualification Group 2 third place)

Final tournament

Winner

Qualification to World Youth Championship
The following teams qualified for the 1981 FIFA World Youth Championship.

References 
Garin, Erik, "Asian U-19 Championship 1980". RSSSF

1980
1980
Youth
1980 in Thai sport
1980 in youth association football
February 1980 sports events in Thailand
March 1980 sports events in Thailand